The Edge Chronicles is a children's fantasy novel series written by Paul Stewart and Chris Riddell. It consists of four trilogies, plus four additional books, and other books related to the universe (The Edge). The series was originally published by Doubleday, a subsidiary of Penguin Random House,  and has sold more than three million copies, according to its publisher.

The stories of The Edge Chronicles take place in the fictional world of The Edge, a vast cliff with no apparent bottom. The majority of books are grouped into sagas, with each saga focusing on one character. The series covers a 600-year period, divided into three "Ages of Flight". In The first age, floating rocks were used to stay airborne but then stone sickness, which made the rocks crumble, hit. Then, floating wood was used, and finally phrax-power. The  power of flight is a major theme of the books, with each age defined by the current technology used for air travel. The series is notable for its flora and fauna, along with the maps of various locations in The Edge.

The first three trilogies were released over the course of 1998 to 2006, with a standalone saga serving as a conclusion to the first two ages of flight and a beginning to the third released in 2009. The series was planned to end after the tenth book, with the author's blog, Weird New Worlds serving as the continuous adventures with weekly 'chapter' installments. After the completion of the 66 chapters of the blog, the authors decided to revisit the series with the fourth trilogy which would adapt the characters and stories from the blog, with the first and second books released in 2014 and 2015 respectively. The series also includes a number of short stories, along with a companion book.

Books

The Quint Trilogy
 The Curse of the Gloamglozer: the novel was first published in 2001. It is the fourth volume of chronicles and the first of the Quint Saga trilogy; within the stories' own chronology it is the first novel, preceding the Twig Saga trilogy that was published earlier.
 The Winter Knights: first published in 2005, it is the eighth volume of chronicles and the second of the Quint Saga trilogy; within the stories' own chronology it is the second novel, preceding the Twig Saga and Rook Saga trilogies that were published earlier.
 Clash of the Sky Galleons: first published in 2006, it is the ninth volume of chronicles and the third of the Quint Saga trilogy; within the stories' own chronology it is the third novel.

Main characters
 Quintinius Verginix, also known as Quint
 Vilnix Pompolnius, also known as Vil Spatweed
 Maris Pallitax
 Phin, Raff and Stope, Quint's friends
 Hax Vostillix, the Hall Master of High Cloud
 Phillius Embertine, Fenviel Vendix and Arboretum Sicklebough, the other Hall Masters
 The Professors of Light and Darkness
 Wind Jackal (Quint's father)
 Thaw Daggerslash (An acquaintance of Wind Jackal)

The Twig Trilogy
 Beyond the Deepwoods (1998)
 Stormchaser: first published in 1999, it is the second volume of chronicles and of the Twig Saga trilogy; within the stories' own chronology it is the fifth novel, following the Quint Saga trilogy that was published later.
 Midnight Over Sanctaphrax: first published in 2000, it is the third volume of the chronicles and of the Twig Saga trilogy; within the stories' own chronology it is the sixth novel.

Characters
Twig
Quintinius Verginix
Vilnix Pompolnius
Slyvo Spleethe
Screed Toe-taker (Screedius Tollinix)
Mother Horsefeather
Hubble the Banderbear
Stope Boltjaw
Mugbutt
Spiker
Goom

The Rook Trilogy
 The Last of the Sky Pirates (2002)
 Vox (2003)
 Freeglader (2004)

The Immortals 
The Immortals is the 10th book of The Edge Chronicles and was released on 5 February 2009 in the United Kingdom and 14 September 2010 in the United States and Canada. The book introduces the Third Age of Flight and the character Nate Quarter, and serves as a conclusion to the Quint, Twig and Rook sagas.

The Cade Trilogy
The Nameless One: first published in 2014, it is the eleventh volume of the chronicles and the first of the Cade Saga trilogy; it is the first main series book since The Immortals.
Doombringer (2015)
The Descenders (2019)

Standalone books
 Cloud Wolf (2001) - A short side story, specially published for World Book Day. Serves as a prequel to the Quint Trilogy.
 The Stone Pilot (2006) - A short side story, specially published for World Book Day.
 The Lost Barkscrolls (2006) an anthology that includes "Cloud Wolf" (2001), "The Stone Pilot" (2006) and two additional short stories from the series named "The Slaughterer's Quest" set between the Twig and Rook trilogies, it follows an adventure of Rook's mother, Keris Barkwater, and "The Blooding of Rufus Filatine" set after Freeglader, it follows an adventure of Rufas Filantine, son of Xanth Filantine.
 The Edge Chronicles Maps (2004) a companion book to the series, detailing the Edge in the First and Second Age of Flight. It also contains a double-sided map: on one side the Edge in the First Age of Flight, on the other the Edge in the Second Age of Flight.

Other
The following titles are not available in book form.
 The Sky Chart: A Book of Quint (2014) (Available in digital form only)
 Weird New Worlds (2009-2011) (Story in blog form spanning 66 posts).

Chronology

The Edge Chronicles books are not always released in chronological order. The following table summarizes the stories to date:

* Part of The Lost Barkscrolls (Also marked by "Side Story" in book number column). Cloud Wolf and The Stone Pilot were also released separately as individual novellas previously.

The Stone Pilot is told from the narrative of Maugin reminiscing on her past. Content of this story falls chronologically fourth while the story is told by Maugin at a later point in time, likely around the end of The Last of the Sky Pirates.

The Edge Chronicles Maps Detail 'The Edge' during the first and second age of flight covering a time period from before Cloud Wolf until some point in time between The Blooding of Rufus Filatine and The Immortals.

Family tree

See also

The Edge Chronicles: Twig Saga
The Edge Chronicles: Rook Barkwater Saga

References

External links
  
 
 
 

 
Fantasy books by series
Young adult fantasy novels
Series of children's books
High fantasy novels
Steampunk literature
Doubleday (publisher) books